This is a list of recordings of Arabella, a three-act opera by Richard Strauss with a German-language libretto by Hugo von Hofmannsthal. It was first performed on 1 July 1933, at the Dresden Sächsisches Staatstheater.

Recordings

References
Notes

Opera discographies
Operas by Richard Strauss